David Robinson OBE is the co-founder of Community Links, chair of the Early Action Task Force, and Honorary Practitioner in Residence at the London School of Economics Marshall Institute, developing new work on tackling social isolation. 

Robinson co-founded east London charity Community Links in 1977 while at school, and was Chief Executive for 25 years. When he stepped down to become Senior Advisor, Community Links was the UK's largest local voluntary organisation.

He co-founded the Children’s Discovery Centre in 2002. It was the UK’s first Story Centre working with more than 100,000 children and their families every year on the development of literacy skills and a love of language and stories. From 2007 to 2010 he led the Prime Minister’s Council on Social Action for Gordon Brown. While there, he initiated and worked with others on the construction of the Social impact bond and went on to chair the successful Peterborough project – the world’s first scheme funded by a Social impact bond The SIB was developed by Social Finance Ltd. where David became a director and where he now chairs the Impact Incubator developing new models in areas of acute social need.

Robinson founded and now chairs Shift - the social enterprise developing products that change behaviour. It began with the million selling Change the world for a fiver series of books before moving on to a range of other products.

He set up Changing London in 2013 to involve Londoners in an independent, three year programme developing ideas for London’s next mayor. Since the mayoral election he has advised on the Mayor's Citizenship and Integration programme. He has also chaired or been a non-executive director with many organisations including BASSAC, Business in the Community, Social Finance Ltd. and the Big Society Trust.

David's books include Changing London (with Will Horwitz), Britain's Everyday Heroes (with Gordon Brown) and Unconditional Leadership as well as numerous papers and reports. He was awarded an Honorary Doctorate from the Open University in 2003 and an OBE in 1995.

David has three children and lives in East London.

References 

Year of birth missing (living people)
Living people